The Starfinder Roleplaying Game is a science-fiction/science fantasy role-playing game published by Paizo Publishing. It is built on Paizo's previous game, the Pathfinder Roleplaying Game, both in its game mechanics and universe, but adapted to a more futuristic style than its fantasy predecessor; game content is intended to be easily convertible between the two systems. Like its predecessor, the Starfinder RPG supports adventure paths and other material written by Paizo and third party publishers.

Background
Starfinder draws inspiration from many other science-fiction and space opera franchises, including Star Wars, Alien, Guardians of the Galaxy, and Warhammer 40,000. Paizo first released a science-fiction product in 2012, with the Distant Worlds supplement to Pathfinder. After the success of Distant Worlds, Paizo decided to create the new system, using it as a base.

The Starfinder RPG was announced in May 2016 on Paizo's website and officially released at Gen Con in August 2017.

Design
Starfinder is based on the first edition of Paizo's previous game, Pathfinder, and like its predecessor uses the d20 system created by Wizards of the Coast for Dungeons & Dragons. Starfinder shares its setting with Pathfinder, set in its far future after Golarion, the planet that Pathfinder was set on, had mysteriously disappeared in an event called "The Gap". The history of the planet during the disappearance is lost to all races, preventing players from returning and interfering with previous events in the Pathfinder timeline, while also acting as the foundation of Starfinder'''s own timeline. Because Starfinder shares its past with Pathfinder, races and monsters of the Pathfinder setting persist in the Starfinder universe alongside new alien races from other worlds. Magic remains a part of the game's mechanics, often intertwined with high-level technology. In the time since the Gap, allied races formed an alliance called the Pact Worlds for diplomacy, trade, and technological sharing, with Absalom Station as their focal point for these activities. An organization called the Starfinder Society, based on Absalom Station and other planets, was established to seek out pre-Gap technology and any information that may have explained what happened prior to that event.

Similar to Pathfinder, the game features personal combat using weapons and magic, though these systems have been simplified and adjusted to the futuristic setting. In addition, Starfinder also has rules regarding starships, space combat, and faster-than-light travel. Starfinder retains the traditional fantasy races as choices for players (for example, elves, dwarves, and orcs), but offers a different set of races as the standard, including the reptilian vesk and rat-like ysoki, while also offering several non-traditional choices such as a "seven-armed starfish". Starfinder also introduces a new array of seven character classes for players to choose from, which can be further customized, and body augmentations which can give different abilities. Starfinder is designed so that content from Pathfinder can be easily converted to Starfinder and vice versa; the game has guidelines on converting characters and monsters between the two systems.

Reception
Early reviews praised Starfinder for its streamlined rules and expansive, flexible setting. The new starship combat rules also received praise, though some criticism was pointed at its repetitiveness and lack of options.Starfinder won the 2018 Origins Award for Fan Favorite Role-Playing Game.

Supplementary content for the game continued to receive a warm reception, including Ports of Call, and Drift Hackers.Supplementary material and related products
Paizo and audio app developer Syrinscape partnered to create an official set of sound effects for Starfinder, and Paizo licensed design studio Ninja Division to create plastic miniatures. These were released alongside the general launch of the game in August 2017.

Paizo along with Audible created a Starfinder Alexa skill adventure pilot episode "Scoundrels in the Spike" released in December 2019. The pilot was considered successful, leading Amazon to have Paizo and Audible create a full six-episode adventure based on the "Dead Suns" campaign, which was first released in August 2020. The adventure, including the pilot, includes voice acting from Nathan Fillion and Laura Bailey along with eleven others. According to Bailey, the voice acting for the newer episodes were done from home studios due to the COVID-19 pandemic though working together online when characters interacted with each other. Within the skill, the user is able to select one of five main characters, and then make certain decisions that can affect the outcome of the story, as well as initiate the game's skill checks and determine how combat progresses; the rules have been simplified from the tabletop version to adapt to voice commands. The skill's pilot episode and first episode of the new campaign were available for free with the remaining episodes available to purchase.

In 2021, Paizo announced the Drift Crisis storyline as part of their Drift Crashers supplement, where the setting's hyperdimensional travel system breaks down.

See alsoPathfinder Roleplaying Game''
List of Starfinder books

References

External links
Starfinder official website

D20 System
Origins Award winners
Paizo Publishing games
Role-playing games introduced in 2017
Science fantasy role-playing games
Space opera role-playing games